Goloboffia vellardi is a species of spider in the family Migidae, found in Chile. Initially described by Zapfe in 1961 in the genus Migas, Griswold and Ledford moved it to their new genus Goloboffia in 2001, where it was initially the only species. In 2019, more species were described.

References

Migidae
Spiders of South America
Spiders described in 1961
Fauna of Chile
Endemic fauna of Chile